Afterlife is a 1978 animated short by Ishu Patel that takes an impressionistic look at life after death, based on recent studies, case histories and myths. In the film, the afterlife state is portrayed as a working-out of all the individual's past experiences.

Summary
Afterlife was produced by Derek Lamb for the National Film Board of Canada. A film without words, Afterlife received numerous awards including a Golden Sheaf Award, a Canadian Film Award for Best Animated Film and the award for Best short Film from the Montreal World Film Festival. Music is by Herbie Mann, performing the David Mills composition, "In Tangier", from his album Stone Flute.

References

External links
 
 
 

1978 films
Canadian animated short films
National Film Board of Canada animated short films
Films directed by Ishu Patel
Animated films without speech
Films about the afterlife
Best Animated Short Film Genie and Canadian Screen Award winners
1970s animated short films
1978 animated films
1970s Canadian films